The 2017 IIHF U18 World Championship Division II was a pair of international under-18 ice hockey tournaments organised by the International Ice Hockey Federation. The Division II A and Division II B tournaments represent the fourth and the fifth tier of the IIHF World U18 Championship.

Division II A

The Division II A tournament was played in Gangneung, South Korea, from 2 to 8 April 2017.

Participants

Match officials
4 referees and 7 linesmen were selected for the tournament.

Referees
 Daniel Bøjle
 Djordje Fazekaš
 Joonas Kova
 Shinichi Takizawa

Linesmen
 Clément Goncalves
 Paweł Kosidło
 Tiange Liu
 David Obwegeser
 Mikita Paliakou
 Tobias Schwenk
 Maximilian Verworner

Standings

Results
All times are local. (Korea Standard Time – UTC+9)

Division II B

The Division II B tournament was played in Belgrade, Serbia, from 13 to 19 March 2017.  Australia achieved the unusual distinction of being promoted in consecutive years.

Participants

Match officials
4 referees and 7 linesmen were selected for the tournament.

Referees
 Lehel Gergely
 Milan Novák
 Andrej Simankov
 Miroslav Štolc

Linesmen
 Murat Aygun
 Tibor Fazekaš
 Martin Jobbágy
 Artsiom Labzov
 Thomas Nordberg Pettersen
 David Perduv
 Anton Peretyatko

Standings

Results
All times are local. (Central European Time – UTC+1)

References

IIHF World U18 Championship Division II
2017 IIHF World U18 Championships
2017
2017
March 2017 sports events in Europe
April 2017 sports events in Asia
Sports competitions in Gangneung
International sports competitions in Belgrade
Ice Hockey
2010s in Belgrade